The Marijnen cabinet was the executive branch of the Dutch Government from 24 July 1963 until 14 April 1965. The cabinet was a continuation of the previous De Quay cabinet and was formed by the Christian-democratic Catholic People's Party (KVP), Anti-Revolutionary Party (ARP) and Christian Historical Union (CHU) and the conservative-liberal People's Party for Freedom and Democracy (VVD) after the election of 1963. The cabinet was a centre-right coalition and had a substantial majority in the House of Representatives with prominent Catholic politician Victor Marijnen the Minister of Agriculture and Fisheries in the previous cabinet serving as Prime Minister. Protestant Leader Barend Biesheuvel served as Deputy Prime Minister, Minister of Agriculture and Fisheries and was given the portfolio of Suriname and Netherlands Antilles Affairs.

The cabinet served in the middle of the tumultuous 1960s, domestically it had to deal with the counterculture and economic changes following the discovery of the Groningen gas field and it had to deal with the fallout of the marriage between Princess Irene and carlist Carlos Hugo of Bourbon-Parma and it was able to implement several major social reforms to health insurance and the public broadcasting system, internationally the disbandment of the Netherlands New Guinea was finalized. The cabinet suffered several major internal conflicts, and fell just 19 months into its term on 27 February 1965 following a conflict over the implantation of Commercial Broadcasting and continued in a demissionary capacity until it was replaced with the Cals cabinet.

Term
The natural gas reserves, recently found in Slochteren were a considerable boost for the economy. This, combined with labour shortage led to a rise in wages and the attraction of foreign workers. Despite this being the second cabinet without socialist Labour Party, the building up of a welfare state, that was started after World War II, continued with the introduction of minimum wages in 1964 and the national health service.

In 1965, measures were taken against commercial television stations transmitting from the North Sea. The cabinet finally fell over the issue if commercial TV should be allowed in the Netherlands.

Cabinet Members

Trivia
 Five cabinet members had previous experience as scholars and professors: Johan Witteveen (Financial Economics), Koos Andriessen (Political Economics), Gerard Veldkamp (Microeconomics), Willem Hendrik van den Berge (Public Economics) and Louis Bartels (Health Economics).
 The three cabinet State Secretaries for Defence where all flag officers: Joop Haex (Major General in the Army), Adri van Es (Rear Admiral in the Navy) and Willem den Toom (Major General in the Air Force).
 Ten cabinet member would later serve in the De Jong cabinet: Joseph Luns (Foreign Affairs), Johan Witteveen (Finance), Piet de Jong (Prime Minister), Leo de Block (Economic Affairs), Joop Bakker (Deputy Prime Minister), Joop Haex (Army), Adri van Es (Navy), Willem den Toom (Defence), Hans Grosheide (Education) and Mike Keyzer (Transport and Water Management).
 Koos Andriessen again served as Minister of Economic Affairs  later in the Third Lubbers cabinet.

References

External links
Official

  Kabinet-Marijnen Parlement & Politiek
  Kabinet-Marijnen Rijksoverheid

Cabinets of the Netherlands
1963 establishments in the Netherlands
1965 disestablishments in the Netherlands
Cabinets established in 1963
Cabinets disestablished in 1965